Joba Arriba is a town in the Espaillat province of the Dominican Republic.

The name Joba dates back to the Taino Indians, who called the river that runs through it "Joba".

External links
 www.jobaarriba.com  –

Populated places in Espaillat Province